Norman Lawrence Himes (April 13, 1900 — September 14, 1958) was a Canadian ice hockey player and professional golfer. Himes played 402 games in the National Hockey League with the New York Americans between 1926 and 1935.

After retiring from hockey Himes became a professional golfer, for the most part at Westmount Golf Club in Kitchener, Ontario. His biggest tournament win as a professional was the Ontario PGA Match Play for the Millar Trophy in 1951.

Career statistics

Regular season and playoffs

Awards
 1930–1931 - NHL Most Game Winning Goals (7)
 1933–1934 - NHL All-Star Game

Professional golf wins
 1951 Millar Trophy (Ontario PGA Match Play)

References

External links
 

1900 births
1958 deaths
Canadian ice hockey centres
Canadian male golfers
Golfing people from Ontario
Ice hockey people from Ontario
New Haven Eagles players
New York Americans players
Ontario Hockey Association Senior A League (1890–1979) players
Sportspeople from Cambridge, Ontario
Canadian expatriate ice hockey players in the United States